The Organic Food Federation is a lobbying organization which certifies organic products in the United Kingdom.

Overview
The organisation was established in 1986. It is headquartered in Swaffham.

It is one of eight such agencies in the UK, alongside the Biodynamic Agriculture Association, the Irish Organic Farmers and Growers Association, Organic Farmers and Growers, the Organic Trust, Quality Welsh Food Certification, the Scottish Organic Producers Association, and the Soil Association.

It has lobbied stakeholders at the Department for Environment, Food and Rural Affairs and the European Commission.

References

Agricultural organisations based in the United Kingdom
Breckland District
Organic farming organizations
Organic farming in the United Kingdom
Organic food certification organizations
Organisations based in Norfolk
1986 establishments in the United Kingdom